Suichwan Airfield is a former World War II United States Army Air Forces airfield in China, located approximately 2  miles southwest-west of Yutianzhen, Suichuan County, Jiangxi Province, China.

History
The airfield was used primarily by forward photo-reconnaissance units flying unarmed P-38 Lightning aircraft over Japanese-occupied territory on intelligence gathering missions beginning in October 1943 until the end of the war.  The airfield was evacuated in June 1944 due to Japanese units advancing in the area, then reactivated in November.   It was again evacuated in late January 1945 in the face of a rapid Japanese advance.  It was again activated on 30 April 1945.    It was eventually closed at the end of the war in October 1945, and appears to have been abandoned.    Aerial photography shows many remains of the field to this day.

References

 Maurer, Maurer. Air Force Combat Units Of World War II. Maxwell Air Force Base, Alabama: Office of Air Force History, 1983. 
 Airfields & Seaplane Anchorages China
 USAFHRA Document Search - Suichwan

Airfields of the United States Army Air Forces in China